Arline Fisch (born August 21, 1931) is an American artist and educator. She is known for her work as a metalsmith and jeweler, pioneering the use of textile processes from crochet, knitting, plaiting, and weaving in her work in metal.
She developed groundbreaking techniques for incorporating metal wire and other materials into her jewelry.

Learning
Arline Fisch was born in Brooklyn, New York City on August 21, 1931 and grew up in New York. She first was taught to sew by her mother, and made many of her own clothes. Her father later gave her lessons at Singer Sewing as a gift so that she and her mother would stop arguing about sewing. Fisch also picked up a passion for bright colors from her father, who loved red.

Fisch studied at Skidmore College, receiving her B.S. in Art in 1952. She received her M.A. in Art in 1954 from the University of Illinois at Urbana–Champaign, where she took classes in metalworking with Arthur J. Pulos. 

After teaching drawing, painting, and design for two years at Wheaton College, she traveled to Copenhagen, Denmark, on a Fulbright Grant to study silversmithing. While there she was able to work in a large jewelry workshop at Bernhard Hertz Guldvaerefabrik, to develop her technical skills.
She received three additional Fulbright grants, one to conduct further research in Denmark and two to lecture in Austria and Uruguay. 

She also attended and has taught at Haystack Mountain School of Crafts where she was introduced to weaving by Jack Lenor Larsen and Ted Hallman. By the 1960s she was beginning to "incorporate weaving in her jewelry" and think about "structuring metal in woven forms". While in Denmark on her second Fulbright in 1966, she spent part of her time studying chasing at the Goldsmiths’ School (Guldsmedehøjskolen) in Copenhagen.

Teaching
Fisch has taught at Wheaton College (1954–1956), Skidmore College (1957–1961), and San Diego State University (1961–2000). 
Fisch founded the San Diego State University program in Jewelry and Metalsmithing in 1961. She retired in 2000, becoming Professor Emerita of Art at San Diego State University.

Metalworking

Arline Fisch is best known for the way she handles metal in her pieces. 
She works with thin wire to create forms that have been manipulated in similar ways to knitted, woven or braided fabric.
Fisch has exhibited extensively all over the world in group shows and solo exhibitions.

Her book, Textile Techniques in Metal for Jewelers, Textile Artists and Sculptors, is a demonstration of the techniques she developed while trying to combine the textures of weaving with a metal material.

She has stated that jewelry of ancient cultures is a continued reference and inspiration for her work. In the exhibition American Metal Work, 1976 at the Sheldon Memorial Art Gallery, her sterling silver Hat was described as equally suited to a Byzantine princess, a modern bridal costume or an evening dress.
Her exhibit Creatures from the Deep created an underwater world of floating sea creatures, jellyfish, corals and sea anemones, knitted and crocheted from wire. Versions of this work were installed in 2008 at the Racine Art Museum, in 2011 at the Houston Center for Contemporary Craft, and in 2013 at the Museum of Craft and Design in San Francisco.

Education
1952 B.S. in Art, Skidmore College, Saratoga Springs, New York
1954 M.A. in Art, University of Illinois at Urbana–Champaign 
1956–57 Danish School of Arts and Crafts, Copenhagen 
1957 Bernhard Hertz Guldvaerefabrik, Copenhagen
1959 Haystack Mountain School of Crafts, Liberty, Maine
1964 School for American Craftsmen, Rochester, New York
1966–67 University of Copenhagen and Apprentice School for Gold and Silversmiths, Copenhagen
1969 private study, Gabrielsen's Guldsmedie, Kolding, Denmark
1970 private study, Gilian Packard and Company, London, England
1971 private study, Stig Berg's Solvzmedie, Copenhagen, Denmark

Honors and awards
1956 Fulbright Research Grant   
1966 Fulbright Research Grant to Denmark
1975 National Endowment for the Arts Craftsman's Fellowship
1977 NEA Craftsman's Apprentice Grant
1979 NEA Craftsman's Workshop Grant (Project Director)
1981 NEA Services to the Field Project Grant
1982 Fulbright Grant, Lecturer, Vienna, Austria
1985 Declared a "Living Treasure of California" by Resolution of California State Assembly 
1986 Distinguished Alumni Achievement Award, Skidmore College, Saratoga Springs, NY
CSU Award for Research, Scholarship and Creative Activity
1989 Fulbright Grant, Lecturer, Montevideo, Uruguay
1990 Meritorious Performance and Professional Promise Award, SDSU
1994 Lifetime Achievement in the Crafts Award, National Museum of Women in the Arts, Washington, D.C.
1996 Outstanding Professor, San Diego State University
2000, Distinguished Educator's Award, James Renwick Alliance
2001 Gold Medal, American Craft Council
2002 Honorary Doctor of Humane Letters, Skidmore College
2003, Masters of the Medium, for Metal/Jewelry, James Renwick Alliance
2006, Fellowship award, United States Artists in support of her creative work
2012, Distinguished Woman Artist for 2012, Fresno Art Museum Council Of 100, with the exhibition, "In the Garden of Delight: Adornments by Arline Fisch," as a celebration.

Professional
Founding Member,  (1969); president (1982-1985)
Craftsman-Trustee, American Crafts Council (1972–1975)
Board of Trustees, Haystack Mountain School of Crafts, Deer Isle, Maine (1973–1982; 1991–2000)
Vice President for North America, World Crafts Council (1976–1981)
Fellow of the American Crafts Council, Class of 1979
Trustee, American Craft Council, (1994-2000)

Publications
  (English & German Edition: Stuttgart: Arnoldsche.)

Collections
Kunstindustrimuseet, Oslo, Norway
Museum of Fine Arts, Boston
Museum of Applied Art, Trondheim, Norway
Museum of Arts and Design, New York City
National Museum of Modern Art, Kyoto, Japan
National Museum of Scotland, Edinburgh, Scotland
Racine Art Museum, Wisconsin
Renwick Gallery of the Smithsonian American Art Museum, Washington D.C.
Vatican Museum, Rome
Victoria & Albert Museum, London

Archives

 A Finding Aid to the Arline M. Fisch Papers, 1931-2015, in the Archives of American Art, Smithsonian Institution
 An interview with Arline M. Fisch, conducted in 2001 July 29-30, by Sharon Church McNabb, for the Archives of American Art

References

1931 births
Living people
American metalsmiths
Women metalsmiths
Wheaton College (Massachusetts) faculty
Artists from Brooklyn
Skidmore College alumni
University of Illinois College of Fine and Applied Arts alumni
Skidmore College faculty
San Diego State University faculty
20th-century American artists
20th-century American women artists
21st-century American women artists
American women academics